Gerardus (Gerard) 't Hooft (born July 5, 1946) is a Dutch theoretical physicist and professor at Utrecht University, the Netherlands. He shared the 1999 Nobel Prize in Physics with his thesis advisor Martinus J. G. Veltman "for elucidating the quantum structure of electroweak interactions".

His work concentrates on gauge theory, black holes, quantum gravity and fundamental aspects of quantum mechanics. His contributions to physics include a proof that gauge theories are renormalizable, dimensional regularization and the holographic principle.

Personal life
He is married to Albertha Schik (Betteke) and has two daughters.

Biography

Early life
Gerard 't Hooft was born in Den Helder on July 5, 1946, but grew up in The Hague. He was the middle child of a family of three. He comes from a family of scholars. His great uncle was Nobel prize laureate Frits Zernike, and his grandmother was married to Pieter Nicolaas van Kampen, a professor of zoology at Leiden University. His uncle Nico van Kampen was an (emeritus) professor of theoretical physics at Utrecht University, and his mother married a maritime engineer. Following his family's footsteps, he showed interest in science at an early age. When his primary school teacher asked him what he wanted to be when he grew up, he replied, "a man who knows everything."

After primary school Gerard attended the Dalton Lyceum, a school that applied the ideas of the Dalton Plan, an educational method that suited him well. He excelled at science and mathematics courses. At the age of sixteen he won a silver medal in the second Dutch Math Olympiad.

Education
After Gerard 't Hooft passed his high school exams in 1964, he enrolled in the physics program at Utrecht University. He opted for Utrecht instead of the much closer Leiden, because his uncle was a professor there and he wanted to attend his lectures. Because he was so focused on science, his father insisted that he join the Utrechtsch Studenten Corps, a student association, in the hope that he would do something else besides studying. This worked to some extent; during his studies he was a coxswain with their rowing club "Triton" and organized a national congress for science students with their science discussion club "Christiaan Huygens".

In the course of his studies he decided he wanted to go into what he perceived as the heart of theoretical physics, elementary particles. His uncle had grown to dislike the subject and in particular its practitioners, so when it became time to write his doctoraalscriptie (former name of the Dutch equivalent of a master's thesis) in 1968, 't Hooft turned to the newly appointed professor Martinus Veltman, who specialized in Yang–Mills theory, a relatively fringe subject at the time because it was thought that these could not be renormalized. His assignment was to study the Adler–Bell–Jackiw anomaly, a mismatch in the theory of the decay of neutral pions; formal arguments forbid the decay into photons, whereas practical calculations and experiments showed that this was the primary form of decay. The resolution of the problem was completely unknown at the time, and 't Hooft was unable to provide one.

In 1969, 't Hooft started on his doctoral research with Martinus Veltman as his advisor. He would work on the same subject Veltman was working on, the renormalization of Yang–Mills theories. In 1971 his first paper was published. In it he showed how to renormalize massless Yang–Mills fields, and was able to derive relations between amplitudes, which would be generalized by Andrei Slavnov and John C. Taylor, and become known as the Slavnov–Taylor identities.

The world took little notice, but Veltman was excited because he saw that the problem he had been working on was solved. A period of intense collaboration followed in which they developed the technique of dimensional regularization. Soon 't Hooft's second paper was ready to be published, in which he showed that Yang–Mills theories with massive fields due to spontaneous symmetry breaking could be renormalized. This paper earned them worldwide recognition, and would ultimately earn the pair the 1999 Nobel Prize in Physics.

These two papers formed the basis of 't Hooft's dissertation, The Renormalization procedure for Yang–Mills Fields, and he obtained his PhD degree in 1972. In the same year he married his wife, Albertha A. Schik, a student of medicine in Utrecht.

Career 

After obtaining his doctorate 't Hooft went to CERN in Geneva, where he had a fellowship. He further refined his methods for Yang–Mills theories with Veltman (who went back to Geneva). In this time he became interested in the possibility that the strong interaction could be described as a massless Yang–Mills theory, i.e. one of a type that he had just proved to be renormalizable and hence be susceptible to detailed calculation and comparison with experiment.

According to 't Hooft's calculations, this type of theory possessed just the right kind of scaling properties (asymptotic freedom) that this theory should have according to deep inelastic scattering experiments. This was contrary to popular perception of Yang–Mills theories at the time, that like gravitation and electrodynamics, their intensity should decrease with increasing distance between the interacting particles; such conventional behaviour with distance was unable to explain the results of deep inelastic scattering, whereas 't Hooft's calculations could.

When 't Hooft mentioned his results at a small conference at Marseilles in 1972, Kurt Symanzik urged him to publish this result; but 't Hooft did not, and the result was eventually rediscovered and published by Hugh David Politzer, David Gross, and Frank Wilczek in 1973, which led to their earning the 2004 Nobel Prize in Physics.

In 1974, 't Hooft returned to Utrecht where he became assistant professor. In 1976, he was invited for a guest position at Stanford and a position at Harvard as Morris Loeb lecturer. His eldest daughter, Saskia Anne, was born in Boston, while his second daughter, Ellen Marga, was born in 1978 after he returned to Utrecht, where he was made full professor. In the academic year 1987-1988 't Hooft spent a sabbatical in the Boston University Physics Department along with Howard Georgi, Robert Jaffe and others arranged by the then new Department chair Lawrence Sulak.

In 2007 't Hooft became editor-in-chief for Foundations of Physics, where he sought to distance the journal from the controversy of ECE theory. 't Hooft held the position until 2016.

On July 1, 2011 he was appointed Distinguished professor by Utrecht University.

Honors
In 1999 't Hooft shared the Nobel prize in Physics with his thesis adviser Veltman for "elucidating the quantum structure of the electroweak interactions in physics". Before that time his work had already been recognized by other notable awards. In 1981, he was awarded the Wolf Prize, possibly the most prestigious prize in physics after the Nobel prize. Five years later he received the Lorentz Medal, awarded every four years in recognition of the most important contributions in theoretical physics. In 1995, he was one of the first recipients of the Spinozapremie, the highest award available to scientists in the Netherlands. In the same year he was also honoured with a Franklin Medal. In 2000, 't Hooft received the Golden Plate Award of the American Academy of Achievement.

Since his Nobel Prize, 't Hooft has received a slew of awards, honorary doctorates and honorary professorships. He was knighted commander in the Order of the Netherlands Lion, and officer in the French Legion of Honor. The asteroid 9491 Thooft has been named in his honor, and he has written a constitution for its future inhabitants.

He is a member of the Royal Netherlands Academy of Arts and Sciences (KNAW) since 1982, where he was made academy professor in 2003. He is also a foreign member of many other science academies, including the French Académie des Sciences, the American National Academy of Sciences and American Academy of Arts and Sciences and the Britain and Ireland based Institute of Physics.

't Hooft has appeared in season 3 of Through the Wormhole with Morgan Freeman.

Research
't Hooft's research interest can be divided in three main directions: 'gauge theories in elementary particle physics', 'quantum gravity and black holes', and 'foundational aspects of quantum mechanics'.

Gauge theories in elementary particle physics
't Hooft is most famous for his contributions to the development of gauge theories in particle physics. The best known of these is the proof in his PhD thesis that Yang–Mills theories are renormalizable, for which he shared the 1999 Nobel Prize in Physics. For this proof he introduced (with his adviser Veltman) the technique of dimensional regularization.

After his PhD, he became interested in the role of gauge theories in the strong interaction, the leading theory of which is called quantum chromodynamics or QCD. Much of his research focused on the problem of color confinement in QCD, i.e. the observational fact that only color neutral particles are observed at low energies. This led him to the discovery that SU(N) gauge theories simplify in the large N limit, a fact which has proved important in the examination of the conjectured correspondence between string theories in an Anti-de Sitter space and conformal field theories in one lower dimension. By solving the theory in one space and one time dimension, 't Hooft was able to derive a formula for the masses of mesons.

He also studied the role of so-called instanton contributions in QCD. His calculation showed that these contributions lead to an interaction between light quarks at low energies not present in the normal theory. Studying instanton solutions of Yang–Mills theories, 't Hooft discovered that spontaneously breaking a theory with SU(N) symmetry to a U(1) symmetry will lead to the existence of magnetic monopoles. These monopoles are called 't Hooft–Polyakov monopoles, after Alexander Polyakov, who independently obtained the same result.

As another piece in the color confinement puzzle 't Hooft introduced 't Hooft loops, which are the magnetic dual of Wilson loops. Using these operators he was able to classify different phases of QCD, which form the basis of the QCD phase diagram.

In 1986, he was finally able to show that instanton contributions solve the Adler–Bell–Jackiw anomaly, the topic of his master's thesis.

Quantum gravity and black holes

When Veltman and 't Hooft moved to CERN after 't Hooft obtained his PhD, Veltman's attention was drawn to the possibility of using their dimensional regularization techniques to the problem of quantizing gravity. Although it was known that perturbative quantum gravity was not completely renormalizible, they felt important lessons were to be learned by studying the formal renormalization of the theory order by order. This work would be continued by Stanley Deser and another PhD student of Veltman, Peter van Nieuwenhuizen, who later found patterns in the renormalization counter terms, which led to the discovery of supergravity.

In the 1980s, 't Hooft's attention was drawn to the subject of gravity in 3 spacetime dimensions. Together with Deser and Jackiw he published an article in 1984 describing the dynamics of flat space where the only local degrees of freedom were propagating point defects. His attention returned to this model at various points in time, showing that Gott pairs would not cause causality violating timelike loops, and showing how the model could be quantized. More recently he proposed generalizing this piecewise flat model of gravity to 4 spacetime dimensions.

With Stephen Hawking's discovery of Hawking radiation of black holes, it appeared that the evaporation of these objects violated a fundamental property of quantum mechanics, unitarity. 't Hooft refused to accept this problem, known as the black hole information paradox, and assumed that this must be the result of the semi-classical treatment of Hawking, and that it should not appear in a full theory of quantum gravity. He proposed that it might be possible to study some of the properties of such a theory, by assuming that such a theory was unitary.

Using this approach he has argued that near a black hole, quantum fields could be described by a theory in a lower dimension. This led to the introduction of the holographic principle by him and Leonard Susskind.

Fundamental aspects of quantum mechanics
't Hooft has "deviating views on the physical interpretation of quantum theory". He believes that there could be a deterministic explanation underlying quantum mechanics. Using a speculative model he has argued that such a theory could avoid the usual Bell inequality arguments that would disallow such a local hidden-variable theory. In 2016 he published a book length exposition of his ideas which, according to 't Hooft, has encountered mixed reactions.

Popular publications

Academic publications

See also

 Asymptotic freedom
 Center vortex
 Naturalness (physics)
 Pauli–Villars regularization
 Slavnov–Taylor identities
 Superdeterminism
 Mars One (Gerard 't Hooft is a main supporter of the project)

References

External links

 Gerard 't Hooft (homepage)
 How To Become a Good Theoretical Physicist
  including the Nobel Lecture A Confrontation with Infinity
 Publications from Google Scholar
 Publications on the arXiv
 TVO.org video - Gerard t'Hooft lectures on Science Fiction and Reality Lecture delivered at the Perimeter Institute in Waterloo, Ontario, Canada on May 7, 2008
 

1946 births
Living people
20th-century Dutch physicists
Members of the Royal Netherlands Academy of Arts and Sciences
Foreign associates of the National Academy of Sciences
Foreign Members of the Russian Academy of Sciences
Nobel laureates in Physics
Dutch Nobel laureates
Utrecht University alumni
Academic staff of Utrecht University
Wolf Prize in Physics laureates
Commanders of the Order of the Netherlands Lion
Officiers of the Légion d'honneur
Lorentz Medal winners
Recipients of the Lomonosov Gold Medal
People from Den Helder
Scientists from Utrecht (city)
Members of the French Academy of Sciences
Institute for Advanced Study visiting scholars
Spinoza Prize winners
Theoretical physicists
Mars One
People associated with CERN
21st-century Dutch physicists